Terry is a common given name. It is also a surname: see Terry (surname).

Terry may also refer to:

Places in the United States
 Terry, Indiana, an unincorporated community
 Terry Township, Finney County, Kansas
 Terry, Louisiana, an unincorporated community
 Terry, Mississippi, a town
 Terry, Pemiscot County, Missouri
 Terry, Montana, a town
 Fort Terry, Plum Island, New York, a former coastal fortification
 Terry Peak, South Dakota, a mountain and ski area
 Terry, South Dakota, an unincorporated community
 Terry County, Texas
 Terry, West Virginia, an unincorporated community

Arts and entertainment
 Terry (book), a pictorial biography on Canadian activist Terry Fox
 Terry (film), a biographical film on Canadian activist Terry Fox
 "Terry" (Twinkle song), 1964
 "Terry" (Kirsty MacColl song)
 Terry (dog), the dog who played Toto in The Wizard of Oz
 Terryana Fatiah, an Indonesian singer whose stage name is Terry
 Takeshi Terauchi, a Japanese guitarist going by the stage name Terry

Other uses
 Terry v. Ohio, a United States Supreme Court decision regarding search and seizure
 , two United States Navy destroyers
 Terry's, chocolate manufacturers of York, England (1767–2005)
 Terry Collection, a collection of human skeletons held by the Department of Anthropology of the National Museum of Natural History, Washington, D.C.
 The Terry College of Business, part of the University of Georgia 
 Terry cloth or terry towelling, absorbent cloth used to make towels and bathrobes
 Tropical Storm Terry, tropical cyclones named Terry

See also
 Justice Terry (disambiguation)
 Teri (disambiguation)
 Terri
 Terry-Thomas (1911–1990), English comedian and actor